Robert Nicolaï is a French linguist specializing in the Songhay languages, professor at the University of Nice Sophia Antipolis.

He is also founder and co-editor of the Journal of Language Contact.

Selected publications

Nicolaï, Robert (1981). Les dialectes du songhay (contribution à l'étude des changements linguistiques). Paris: SELAF
Nicolaï, Robert (1984). Préliminaires à une étude sur l'origine du songhay (problématique, matériaux et hypothèses). Berlin: Dietrich Reimer.
Nicolaï, Robert (1990). Parentés linguistiques (à propos du songhay). Paris: Editions du CNRS.
Nicolaï, Robert; Zima, Petr (1997). Songhay. Münich/Newcastle: Lincom Europa.
Nicolaï, Robert. (2000). La Traversée de l’empirique : essai d’épistémologie sur la construction des représentations de l’évolution des langues. Paris: Ophrys.
Nicolaï, Robert (2003). La force des choses ou l’épreuve nilo-saharienne : questions sur les reconstructions archéologiques et l’évolution des langues. Köln: Rüdiger Köppe Verlag.
Nicolaï, Robert (2007). La vision des faits, De l'a posteriori à l'a priori dans la saisie des langues. Paris: L'Harmattan.

Notes

External links
Chair of "Dynamics of Language and Language Contact", University of Nice
Journal of Language Contact

Living people
Linguists from France
Linguists of Songhay languages
French Africanists
Year of birth missing (living people)